CPD-1 (LS-193743) is a drug with a benzofuranyl piperazine structure, which acts as a potent and selective agonist for the 5-HT2 receptor family, with highest affinity and full agonist efficacy at the 5-HT2C subtype, and lower affinity and partial agonist action at the 5-HT2A and 5-HT2B subtypes.

See also 
 2,3-Dichlorophenylpiperazine
 3-Chloro-4-fluorophenylpiperazine
 2C-B-PP
 ORG-12962
 TFMFly
 TFMPP

References 

Serotonin receptor agonists
Trifluoromethyl compounds
Benzofurans
N-(2-methoxyphenyl)piperazines